32 Service Battalion (32 Svc Bn) is a reserve combat service support (CSS) unit within the Canadian Army. The unit is formed under command of 32 Canadian Brigade Group in the 4th Canadian Division. The Service Battalion is composed of soldiers from the Corps of  Royal Canadian Electrical and Mechanical Engineers and Royal Canadian Logistics Service to include: vehicle technicians, weapons technicians, cooks, financial service administrators, human resource administrators, material management technicians and mobile support equipment operators. It is located at LCol George Taylor Denison III Armoury in Toronto, Ontario.

History

Formation 
32 Service Battalion traces its roots from No. 2 Company Canadian Army Service Corps (CASC), Non-Permanent Active Militia. The Canadian Army Service Corps was formed under General Order 141 on 1 November 1901 with four companies No. 1 (London), No. 2 (Toronto), No. 3 (Kingston), and No. 4 (Montreal). A second Toronto Company was formed in February 1907 as No.12 Company (Toronto).

On 1 January 1965, No. 2 Company (Toronto) and No. 12 Company (Toronto) were reformed into Service Battalions bringing together several corps into one organization as a new service support concept, which was adopted nationally in 1968. 1st Toronto Service Battalion was lodged at the Denison Armoury in North York, the former home of 5 Column RCASC, under the command of LCol Bruce J. Legge. It consisted of 134 Company RCASC, 12 Ordnance Company, 45 Technical Squadron, and 2 Company C Pro C. As part of the 1965 reorganization, a second Service Battalion was also formed as 2nd Toronto Service Battalion under the command of LCol Joe Hansen (originally lodged at Falaise Armoury, but moved to Moss Park Armoury when it first opened in 1966). It consisted of 136 Company RCASC, 13 Ordnance Company, 46 Technical Squadron, and 7 Company C Pro C.

1st Toronto Service Battalion merged with 2nd Toronto Service Battalion on 1 April 1970 to form the Toronto Service Battalion and in 1975 Service Battalions were numbered geographically with Toronto Service Battalion becoming 25 (Toronto) Service Battalion. The unit was later renamed 32 Service Battalion on 13 May 2010.

Role 
The role of 32 Service Battalion is to force generate trained soldiers to support Canada's operational requirements domestically and abroad. 32 Service Battalion provides combat service support capabilities to domestics operations such as floods, forest fires, and other domestic crises such as the COVID pandemic. The soldiers of the battalion are part-time soldiers from technical fields plus a small full-time cadre (Regular Force) that facilitates the day-to-day operations of the unit.

Order of Battle

Overview 
32 Service Battalion is a combat service support battalion with 300 soldiers based out of Denison Armouries in Toronto, Ontario. It has an Administration Company, a Maintenance Company (45 Technical Squadron), and a Logistics Company (135 Logistics Company).

Companies

Deployments

International 
 Operation ATHENA
 Operation ATTENTION
 Operation IMPACT (2020-2021)

Domestic 
 Operation LENTUS
 Operation LASER 20 (2020)

Leadership

Commanding Officers 
 2019–present: LCol K.M. Perry

Regimental Sergeant Majors 
 2019–present: CWO A.G. Gliosca

Honouraries

Honourary Colonels 
 2016–present: HCol H. Panday

Honorary Lieutenant Colonels 
 2010–2016: HLCol H. Panday
 2021–present: HLCol T. Carnegie

Affiliated Cadet Corps 
2754 (32 Service Battalion) Royal Canadian Army Cadet Corps

See also 

 Military history of Canada
 Canadian Armed Forces
 History of the Canadian Army
 Canadian Army
 4th Canadian Division
 32 Canadian Brigade Group
 Corps of Royal Canadian Electrical and Mechanical Engineers
 Royal Canadian Logistics Service
 Royal Canadian Army Service Corps
 Royal Canadian Ordnance Corps
 Primary Reserve

References

External links 

 Official 32 Service Battalion Website

Corps of the Canadian Army
Brigades of the Canadian Army
Army units and formations of Canada in World War II
Military units and formations of Canada in World War II
Military units and formations established in 1944
Military logistics units and formations of Canada
Military maintenance